Josef Argauer (15 November 1910, in Vienna – 10 October 2004) was an Austrian football coach.

He was the coach of the Austria national football team during the 1958 FIFA World Cup.

External links

1910 births
2004 deaths
Austrian football managers
1958 FIFA World Cup managers
FK Austria Wien managers
Wiener Sport-Club managers
Sportspeople from Vienna